Carol Bruce (born Shirley Levy; November 15, 1919 – October 9, 2007) was an American band singer, Broadway star, and film and television actress.

Early years
Bruce was born Shirley Levy in a Jewish family, in Manhattan, to Beatrice and Harry Levy. She had a sister, Marilyn.

Because of her family's moving, she attended Jamaica High School, Girls' High School, and New Utrecht High School before graduating from Erasmus Hall High School in Brooklyn, New York. Although she studied violin for eight years, she never took singing lessons.

Singing
Bruce began her career as a singer in the late 1930s with Larry Clinton and his band. She sang with Ben Bernie's orchestra in 1940-1941.

Stage
Bruce made her Broadway debut in Louisiana Purchase, with songs by Irving Berlin, who discovered her at a nightclub in Newark, New Jersey. She was the first actress to play the role of Julie in a Broadway production of Jerome Kern and Oscar Hammerstein II's Show Boat since the 1932 Broadway revival. Bruce played the role onstage in 1946 and garnered favorable comparisons to Helen Morgan, who had originated the role onstage in 1927 and repeated it in both the 1932 revival and the 1936 film.

Her other Broadway credits include New Priorities of 1943, Along Fifth Avenue, Do I Hear a Waltz?, Henry, Sweet Henry, and A Family Affair.

Film
Bruce appeared with Abbott and Costello in Keep 'Em Flying (1941). Her first serious film role was in This Woman Is Mine (1941). She had supporting roles many years later in the films American Gigolo (1980) and Planes, Trains and Automobiles (1987).

Radio
Bruce's radio debut came on The Horn and Hardart Children's Hour. She sang on Carton of Pleasure and The Henny Youngman Show.

Television
After a long career as a singer and in films, Bruce is probably best-remembered for her recurring role as the domineering and meddlesome Lillian "Mama" Carlson (mother of the station manager played by Gordon Jump) on CBS' WKRP in Cincinnati.  In real life, Bruce was only 12 years older than Jump.  Sylvia Sidney played Mr. Carlson's mother in the pilot episode.

Personal life
Bruce's only marriage to Milton Nathanson, which ended in divorce, produced a daughter, Julie, an actress, singer and playwright who married jazz guitarist Larry Coryell. Bruce's grandchildren, Murali and Julian Coryell, are both musicians. Bruce was Jewish.

Bruce was a Democrat who supported Adlai Stevenson's campaign in the 1952 presidential election.

Death
Bruce died from chronic obstructive pulmonary disease at the Motion Picture & Television Country House and Hospital in Woodland Hills, California, aged 87. She was survived by her sister and two great-grandsons. Upon her death, she was cremated and her ashes given to her cousin.

References

External links

American film actresses
American musical theatre actresses
American television actresses
Donaldson Award winners
Erasmus Hall High School alumni
Musicians from Brooklyn
Actresses from New York City
1919 births
2007 deaths
Jewish American actresses
Jewish American musicians
20th-century American actresses
21st-century American actresses
California Democrats
New York (state) Democrats
20th-century American singers
20th-century American women singers
New Utrecht High School alumni
Jamaica High School (New York City) alumni
Girls' High School alumni
20th-century American Jews
21st-century American Jews